Non Boonjumnong (born June 12, 1982 as Manon Boonjumnong) is a Thai amateur boxer who won silver at welterweight at the World Championships 2007. In the older tournaments he is listed as "Manon".

Career
Non, who is the younger brother of Olympic gold medalist Manus Boonjumnong, won a bronze medal at the 2002 Asian Games, when he lost his semifinal to eventual winner Kim Jung-Joo.

In 2005 he competed for Thailand at the Boxing World Cup in Moscow, Russia, losing both his matches in the preliminary round.

In 2007 in Chicago he beat Andrey Balanov to reach the finals but had to quit with an injury against American southpaw Demetrius Andrade. He trailed in points at the time.

At the 2008 Olympics he was upset by little-known Hosam Bakr Abdin.

External links
 Asian Games 2002
 
 

1982 births
Living people
Non Boonjumnong
Welterweight boxers
Non Boonjumnong
Boxers at the 2008 Summer Olympics
Asian Games medalists in boxing
Non Boonjumnong
Boxers at the 2002 Asian Games
Medalists at the 2002 Asian Games
Southeast Asian Games medalists in boxing
Non Boonjumnong
AIBA World Boxing Championships medalists
Non Boonjumnong
Competitors at the 2005 Southeast Asian Games
Competitors at the 2007 Southeast Asian Games
Non Boonjumnong
Non Boonjumnong